Pakistan reached its peak in the 1980s and 1990s during the reigns of Jahangir Khan and Jansher Khan. Between 1950 and 1997, Pakistan amassed over 30 British Open titles, 14 World Open titles and many more PSA professional titles.

History

Hashim Khan was the first Pakistani to dominate the sport. Having been a squash coach in the British Army, when Pakistan gained independence he joined as a coach for the Pakistan Air Force. It was there that he impressed the officers with his skills that they sent him to England to compete out of their own pocket. Despite being in his late forties, Hashim Khan showed great skill and speed and in 1951 competed in the prestigious British Open.

It was there also that he laid the foundation of Pakistani dominance in Squash. Hashim defeated 4 times winner the current champion Mahmoud Karim of Egypt in devastating fashion, 9-5, 9-0, 9-0.

He went on to win British Open titles, 6 titles over 8 years.

Pakistani control over the World Open, British Open, Hong Kong Open and the Super Series , The names of such great maestros such as Azam Khan, Roshan Khan, Mo Khan, Qamar Zaman, Jahangir Khan, and Jansher Khan have dominated the sport.

Of these, Jansher Khan is considered by many to be the greatest player ever the grace a squash court. During his career he won the World Open a record eight times and the British Open six times.

However, since 1998, when Jansher Khan was defeated in the British Open final, Pakistan squash has fallen from its height and now no longer is the dominant force in squash. No Pakistani since has reached the final of either the British or World Open.

Present

Pakistan host a number of international squash tournaments and have many professional training centres around the country. Pakistani squash players still have a big presence in both the men’s and women’s games, but no one player has reached the standards of past players.

See also 
 Pakistan International

External links
 Pakistan Squash Federation homepage